Tom Raes (born 8 January 1988) is a Belgian footballer who currently plays for SK Westrozebeke  as a centre-back.

External links

1988 births
Living people
Belgian footballers
Association football defenders
K.S.V. Roeselare players
Challenger Pro League players
People from Roeselare
Royal FC Mandel United players
Footballers from West Flanders